Nicolás Matías Temperini (born 9 February 1995) is an Argentine professional footballer who plays as a goalkeeper for Santamarina.

Career
Temperini began his career with Newell's Old Boys. He was an unused substitute on two occasions during the 2015 Argentine Primera División season for matches with Rosario Central and San Martín. In August 2016, Temperini joined fellow Primera División team Talleres on loan. He returned to his parent club a year later without playing for Talleres' first-team, only featuring for their youth sides. Temperini's professional debut arrived on 29 October 2018, with the goalkeeper featuring for the full duration of a 2–0 win at home to Argentinos Juniors; having previously been an unused substitute in ten further fixtures.

Career statistics
.

References

External links

1995 births
Living people
Sportspeople from Santa Fe Province
Argentine footballers
Argentine expatriate footballers
Association football goalkeepers
Argentine Primera División players
Newell's Old Boys footballers
Talleres de Córdoba footballers
Club Atlético Mitre footballers
UE Sant Julià players
Club y Biblioteca Ramón Santamarina footballers
Argentine expatriate sportspeople in Andorra
Expatriate footballers in Andorra